Moods of Norway AS was a Norwegian clothing brand started by Stefan Dahlquist, Peder Børresen, and Simen Staalnacke in 2003. The company declared bankruptcy on 20 September 2017.

After the bankruptcy, the old owners bought back the rights to the Moods of Norway trademark.

Moods of Norway was relaunched in March 2019, now under the shorter brandname Moods.

History 
The trio was featured in the July 2009 issue of Cliché Magazine, with a story of their growing brand. Dahlkvist and Staalnacke were studying at Hawaii Pacific University, when Børresen (who was an old friend of Staalnacke's) visited. A conversation at a late night party about a fashion brand with a Norwegian twist led to the group launching the first collection in 2003. After a handful of stores in Norway, Japan, Sweden, the Netherlands, and Switzerland, Moods of Norway opened a U.S. flagship store in May 2009 on Robertson Boulevard in Beverly Hills. but the company relocated that store to Melrose Avenue in Los Angeles.

The company sports the slogan "Happy Clothes for Happy People." In the midst of their fun and edgy designs, the designers were able to incorporate their sense of humor. "246.619" is embroidered in every one of the men's suits, referring to the number of tractors in Norway.

In 2010 the brand released their first fully electronic product, a waffle iron which made waffles shaped like tractors. However, on November 17, 2011, they asked customers via Facebook and other social media, to return their waffle irons, stating it could be a fire hazard.

In 2014 Moods of Norway was one of the official designers for the Norwegian Olympic team uniforms at the  Sochi Olympics opening ceremony.

On 20 September 2017 Moods of Norway declared itself bankrupt. A month later Simen Staalnacke, Jan Egil Flo and some former employees bought the bankruptcy estate for 52.6 MNOK.

Brand stores 
Moods of Norway operated stores in Norway, Iceland, Japan, and the United States:

 Bodø, Norway
 Tromsø, Northern Norway
 Langevåg, Ålesund, Norway
 Stryn, Norway
 Flø, Norway
 Oslo, Norway
 Bergen, Norway
 Trondheim, Norway
 Stavanger, Norway
 Geiranger, Norway
 Tokyo, Japan
 Reykjavík, Iceland
 Los Angeles, United States

References 

Clothing brands
Companies based in Sogn og Fjordane
2000s fashion
Clothing companies established in 2003
Clothing companies disestablished in 2017
Clothing companies of Norway
2003 establishments in Norway
2017 disestablishments in Norway